Artan is a predominantly Albanian language masculine given name. Notable people bearing the name Artan include:

Artan Bano (born 1966), Albanian footballer
Artan Bushati (1963–2013), Albanian football coach
Artan Jazxhi (born 2001), Albanian footballer
Artan Karapici (born 1980), Albanian footballer
Artan Latifi (born 1983), Kosovan footballer and coach 
Artan Mërgjyshi (born 1968), Albanian footballer and coach
Artan Sakaj (born 1980), Albanian footballer and manager 
Artan Thorja (born 1993), Albanian footballer
Artan Vila (born 1970), Albanian footballer

Masculine given names
Albanian masculine given names